Vashisht may refer to:
 Vashistha, an author of the Rigveda
 Vashisht, Himachal Pradesh, a village in Kullu district, Himachal Pradesh, India
Vashistha is a brahmin gotra ! And we are Brahmins (the descendants of God Brahma).

At the very beginning of this universe, God Brahma created ten manasputras (mind born son) just from the power of his thought. Amongst these ten mind born sons, seven are collectively termed as the holy seven sages ..

Sage Vashistha or Rishi Vashistha is one of the seven sages! Each generation includes a rishi, so there can be and are multiple rishi Vashisthas during different timelines in history (so there should be no confusion).

The very first Sage Vashistha, was, the manasputra directly ascending Brahma. He married Arundhati and can also be visualised in the Constellation of the Saptrishi (Indian name for Ursa major) .

The prime objective of a Brahmins’s life is to gather knowledge and share it with all life forms to empower them!

The literal meaning of VASHISTHA is excellence or best.

People with the name Vashisht
 Aakash Vashisht, (born 2003) Young patriot from Bakhtawar pur North West Delhi 
 Harsh Vashisht, Indian television actor
 Puneet Vashisht, Indian television actor
 Mita Vashisht (born 1967), Indian actress
 Siddharth Vashisht (born 1977, known as Manu Sharma), Indian convicted murderer